Kana Kaanum Kaalangal is a Tamil drama soap opera that aired in Star Vijay, Monday to Thursday, from 30 October 2006 to 7 June 2013.  It was the first soap in Tamil television that focused on school life. Due to the success of the show, a sequel called Kana Kaanum Kaalangal Kallooriyin Kadhai was made. Later another sequel to the serial called Kana Kaanum Kalangal Kalloori Saalai was also made. Both the sequels focused on college life. It was re-aired on Star Vijay Super from 16 January 2017, Monday through Friday at 8:00PM.

Plot
The story is set in school revolving around 12 students, separated into 2 groups. The plot details the rivalry between these 2 groups and the consequences of this. Everyday happenings of the student life are portrayed in this series to very minute details like healthy competition, fights, family matters, ego, jealousy, love and friendship.

Kana Kaanum Kaalangal Season 1
The story is set in PACM Matriculation School, a private school in Chennai administered by Chidambaram, the correspondent of the school founded by his father. His ambition is to boost the reputation of his school to state level. There are 2 separate groups of students in this school. Bala Gang consists of Bala, Pandi, Pachaiyappan, Joseph, Deepa and Ragini, whereas Vineeth Gang consists of Vineeth, Krishnamoorthy, Rishi, Unni Menon and Saraswathi. These groups have been studying in that school since primary section, and have had a rivalry for years due to misunderstandings, their ego and difference in social class; they often compete and end up in fights. After passing the 10th Public Exams they are entering 11th standard. Raghavi & Sanghavi are sisters who have newly joined the school for the same batch class. There is some mystery about them, since Sanghavi doesn't seem to like Raghavi, while Raghavi is aloof with her family and seem to be dull. As usual Vineeth Gang and Bala Gang get into a fight, accidentally breaking the notice board. Raghavi sees this and, due to the principal Madhavi's strict approach, Raghavi unwillingly exposes the culprits and earns the hatred of both gangs. Both Vineeth and Bala are asked to bring their parents which they manage to escape. Vineeth gang tries to bully Sanghavi after they discovered that she is Raghavi's sister to which she says that she doesn't bother about her at all. So, Vineeth gang accepts Sanghavi as their friend. Both the gangs rag and bully Raghavi due to their anger. Later it's revealed that Raghavi is Sanghavi's foster sister. Raghavi lived happily with her father, mother & younger sister Kalavathy in Nagapattinam. Sanghavi used to happily live with her father Rajendran, mother Lakshmi, younger sister Raghavi, grandfather and grandmother in Chennai. The happiness in their lives was shattered by a tsunami when both the families went on a trip to Rameswaram. Raghvai had lost her family, while Rajendran and Lakshmi had lost their daughter Raghavi. Rajendran and Lakshmi adopt Raghavi, but Sanghavi despises her since she couldn't accept another girl in her late sister's place. There was a fight between Rajendran and Sanghavi over Raghavi. Raghavi due to which Rajendran gets heart attack. Raghavi promised that she won't leave this family. Sanghavi also apologizes to Rajendran for her rude behaviour, but yet she isn't ready to accept Raghavi. Raghavi is trying to recover from her past trauma and get normal with her new family, especially with Sangahavi and her new classmates. Raghavi slowly becomes close with her foster parents, but still struggles to earn the friendship of both of gangs and affection from Sanghavi. Raghavi breaks the record of Pachai, securing the 1st rank in the class, pushing Pachai & Rishi to 2nd and 3rd rank respectively; this cause Raghavi to be appointed as the class leader. This further angers both the gangs, but after a point Raghavi deals it softly. Raghavi saves Bala Gang from getting punished for being mischievous in the class by not complaining them to Madhavi and gets punished. Raghavi earns a good name in the books of Bala Gang and they apologize to her. Vineeth Gang, who saw a potential truce between Raghavi and Bala Gang, perform a dangerous prank on Raghavi at the lab. Bala Gang's efforts to warn & and stop her from that danger is to no avail as she gets injured; Bala Gang retaliates by getting into a fight with Vineeth Gang. Bala Gang accepts Raghavi as their friend. Raghavi volunteers to partly sponsor Pachai's school fees and becomes close to his family. Both the gangs become close with Raghavi and Sanghavis' family; they visit the siblings' home and join the picnic organized by their family. Raghavi and Sanghavi visits their friends' homes. Vineeth Gang also visited Sis Sara's home and become friendly with her family members.

Raghavi is a talented Veena player which is adored by her parents; she also attends Veena claases from Krish's mother. Sanghavi is jealous about it &anddecides to compete by her joining Veena classes from Raghavi's biological mother who is still alive and stays at an ashram. She is aware that Raghavi had survived the tsunami, but doesn't know  her whereabouts. Rajendran & Lakshmi heard her story and promised to her find her daughter without knowing it's Raghavi. Since Raghavi became a friend of Bala Gang, Vineeth Gang often bullys Raghavi which Sanghavi enjoys. Once Krish condemned Sanghavi for being so rude, enjoying her sister's suffering. Bala Gang retaliates it despite Raghavi's plea by writing about Vineeth & Sanghavi in the toilet which angered Vineeth Gang and they got into a fight with Bala Gang. Raghavi was initially angry with her friends, but later she'd forgiven them after they promised that they won't disturb her sister. Both the Gangs performs at the farewell function of the 12th standard students. Apart from their rivalry, some family & personal problems both the gangs happily spend their school life with friendly staffs like newly joined biology teacher Jeeva who is an old student in that school, physics teacher Vincent who is good debate judge, playing fun with PT Master Peeli Sivam, getting caught to strict teachers like Gabriel, Shamughanathan, got acquitted with a friendly police inspector Kathiresan & of course having fun moments within themselves. There was a conflict between Raghavi & Bala Gang because she was purposely absent during the SPL election to support Bala which led to his withdrawal from the election & victory of Sanghavi who got appointed as the new SPL. Soon Raghavi & Bala Gang patch up, Bala Gang often loggerheads with Vineeth Gang irritating them by bringing funny & silly complaints to them & picking up fights. Both gangs proposes an idea to open a Film Society in their school which was well received by correspondent & opens the Film Society. Despite all odds, the friendship within Bala Gang & the friendship within Vineeth Gang remained strong by cherishing each & every moment like birthdays within themselves.

In the meantime Pachai develops a crush for Raghavi, reads her diary which was accidentally placed with her notebooks & discovers her past 
which further becomes love, but he promised Raghavi that he won't reveal her secret to anyone. Pandi's family is planning get him married to his cousin to much of friends fun. Pachai who is the most soft person in Bala's Gang got aggressive & bitter towards Vineeth by geting into a fight after he was teased for his part time work, later his father  Murugan  who works as a cleaner in their school was insulted. But, Vineeth apologized to Murugan since he didn't mean it as it was only to irritate who teased him & Sanghavi along with his friends & became close with Murugan like Pachai's friends. Rishi & Unni used to curiously ask both Vineeth & Sanghavi what's between them to which both of them either smile & answer them in an irritating or confusing manner since they are only good friends. Krish does some cheap tricks to separate Vineeth & Sanghavi because of his possessiveness on Vineeth, his addiction to drugs became intense that Vineeth discovered his addiction & warns him to give up. But, Krish had ties with the drug peddlers by secretly smuggling drugs & almost got caught by Vineeth. 

Both the gangs were preparing the 3rd term exams to pass 11th standard, Gabriel the chemistry teacher as well as Jo's father prepares the question papers tough. Raghavi, Pachai & Rishi are extremely clever in studies. Vineeth, Krish, Sanghavi & Deepa are decent to good in studies, but Krish has been distracted from studies because of his addiction, but yet manages. Bala, Jo & Unni are average in studies, but now since he works as a part time Pizza delivery boy due to his conflict with his father, he hardly gets time to study & unable to concentrate on studies, so he is worried about exams despite the coaching of Raghavi & Pachai. So, Pandi plays a prank on Bala's employer as a result Bala is fired, so now he can concentrate on studies. Pandi is of course very weak in studies, he is least about it. Jo is very average in studies & Unni is slightly better than Pandi because of Rishi & Sanghavi's coaching. But, the weak & average students might have a chance of failing. So, Jo risks by stealing his father's question paper & leaks for the sake of his friends. The students had written the exams, but soon the issue became big that Gabriel had landed into deep trouble. Madhavi isn't bothered about his good reputation or his innocence in this matter it & asks him to give a proper explanation or else he'll be dismissed. Jo who is guilty & worried about his father admits his mistake to the principal thereby proving his father's innocence & at the same time got suspended. With all the students passed the exams & got promoted to 12th standard. Bala Gang gets emotional about whether they'll be in the same class. During holidays both the gangs boys spend in Kodaikanal where they bump at each other without fighting have fun & emotional moments, even with PT Peelisivam who'd come with his wife & with a Doctor with who they become acquitted. Both the gangs returns to the school & once again become classmates. Bala got patch up with his father when his father supported his opportunity to play for a State Level Cricket Club, thus giving habit of taking bribe. Soon the entire Vineeth Gang got to know about Krish's drug addiction due to which a fight breaks within Sanghavi & Vineeth. Bala Gang was also suspicious about Krish's weird behaviour within school premises. Despite the efforts of Vineeth Gang to patch up with Sanghavi, Sanghavi was still adamant to choose either her or Krish to which Vineeth disagree. Vineeth tried to patch up with Sanghavi by talking with Raghavi, by making her possessive & talk to him. But, it only ended up as a fight. 

In order to irritate each other to trigger their possessiveness Vineeth Gang starts talking & hanging up with Raghavi with whom their anger got vanished & they'd good opinion since Raghavi had been nice to them in certain encounters & Sanghavi starts talking & hanging up with Bala Gang. But, Raghavi always wanted Sanghavi to be happy & asks Vineeth to promise that he won't not fight with Sanghavi. Soon Raghavi & Sanghavi became a bridge & common friend between both the gangs. But, Pachai started losing focus on studies due to his hidden feelings for Raghavi as a result he shockingly got low marks for Physics, later he becomes jealous with Vineeth for talking with Raghavi & challenged Vineetha for a fight, but Vineeth Gang gave up the fight as per Raghavi's request. Sanghavi started liking Raghavi after realizing she is in deed a good girl who is yearning for Sanghavi's affection, most of all Sanghavi had read Raghavi's diary which made her regret for being rude to Raghavi & decided to accept Raghavi as her sister along with a truce with Vineeth Gang. Next day Sanghavi even drops Raghavi at school, proposes Raghavi to be the clas leader along with revealing that she is her sister to much of Raghavi, Bala Gang & Vineeth Gang's happiness. Sanghavi left a letter of apology to Vineeth to much of his happiness goes to meet her. Sanghavi meets Krish at the terrace of the school apologizing for the fight & calls Vineeth Gang to join them. But, Krish was also completely intoxicated & misunderstood that she is calling the police & tried to snatch her mobile phone, but Sanghavi accidentally falls from terrace which was witnessed by Vineeth. Sanghavi is admitted to the hospital with heavy head injury, whereas Vineeth Gang gives their statement over the incident to the police. Krish is guilty, but got released since it was unintentional & moreover Sanghavi or her family spared him. Raghavi & her parents are worried about Sanghavi's health condition. Vineeth was worried about Sanghavi that he hits a worried & guilty Krish who comes to the hospital & asks his Gang to chase him. Vineeth to promises to Sanghavi  that he'll take good care of Raghavi. Then Sanghavi dies with her family & friends being surrounded. Krish is remorseful of what happened, apologized to his mother for his strained relationship with her & goes to rehabilitation centre. 

Slowly Bala Gang recovers from Sanghavi's death after mourning for days, but Raghavi & Vineeth still couldn't come out of it despite their friends efforts to console & cheer them. Vineeth had taken leave to recover from the loss of Sanghavi. Raghavi gradually recovered from the loss of Sanghavi. A new set of students from various schools joins this school for the 11th standard admission. 3 separate groups joins this school, Sullan Gang consists of Sriram, Madan, Lingeswaran & Pulikesi who were from different schools became friends in their way to their new school Out of them Puli is Pandi's cousin brother, but there is a funny rivalry between them because of their family dispute. Rocky Gang consists of Rakesh, Thomas & Aadhi who were already friends since they were from the same school. The Girls Gang consists of Mittu, Karthi & Mano were already friends since they were from the same school just like Rocky Gang. Soon they try show off & become the heroes in that school by messing up with Bala Gang who tapped their level due to which a rivalry between in sparked. Chidambaram suddenly faces problems regarding his school since he'd taken a land  for playground & the owner of the land decided to sell it. Chidambaram worried that he might've to close the school if the permit gets cancelled due to the loss of land. So, he tries to his best to find an alternate land for the playground or at least extend the deadline to retain the permit, due to some external pressures the officers are also being unusually strict & however he manages to extend the deadline. Already there is an ongoing trial over the school between Chidamabaram & Moorthy one of the stakeholers claiming for the ownership of the school. As a result of worries & stress Chidambaram get heart attack & later got got discharged. 

The school management announces the SPL Election. Vineeth Gang remained silent as they aren't interested since worried about the things happened to their friends. But, Bala Gang is fully enthusiastic to participate the election & this time they nominate Raghavi as the candidate. Bala Gang actively starts their canvassing activities, although Raghavi isn't interested since her the friends were the ones who nominated her & she wants to avoid a potential rivalry between her friends & her junior students. On the other hand Sullan Gang & Rocky Gang are also interested to participate the election, so that they get an opportunity to shine  & at the same time to oppose their seniors students. Mittu, Karthi & Mano suggests both the gangs to unite to which they agreed & nominates Aadhi. Realizing the fact about their low winning chance in the election, the 11th standard students pleads Raghavi to withdraw to which she ageeed & withdrew from the election. Bala Gang got shocked to see the actual result on the noticeboard. Bala Gang who got embarrassed in front of their junior students, showed their anger, disappointment & frustration over Raghavi by getting into a fight with her since this is not the 1st time she'd let them down. Despite Pachai's pleas to forgive Raghavi his friends doesn't listen to him. Later Raghavi confesses the real reason to Pachai why she withdrew from election as she worried that their friends focus will completely get deviated from studies due to the election. Pachai explains the reason for Raghavi's decision to his friends to which they apologize to Raghavi & patch up with her. 

Vineeth returns to school after slightly recovering from the trauma of Sanghavi's loss & welcomed by his friends. Krish who is who completely rehabilitated and changed also returns to school, but Vineeth Gang doesn't accept him as Vineeth is still angry him & not ready to forgive due to which Rishi & Unni couldn't do anything. Initially Bala Gang mocked Krish & condemned Vineeth Gang indirectly, but later they started to sympathize him. Krish apologizes to Raghavi for the bitter incident that it was unintentional, later Krish's mother also meets pleads to forgive & accept her son to which Raghavi forgives him as she felt sorry for him. Suddenly the drug peddlers approach Krish to which he politely refuses. Later the insecured drug peddlers beats him & threatens to join them. Vineeth Gang avoids him without rescuing despite Rishi & Unni felt bad him. But, Bala Gang rescues Krish by getting into a fight with the drug peddlers & chases them. Although they'd saved him since he is there school student, still they have mixed feelings whether accept him or not. Even though Rishi & Unni kept insisting Vineeth to forgive Krish, still Vineeth doesn't agree with it. Puli plays a prank on Raghavi leaving an anonymous love letter, but caught by Bala Gang, Pachai was furious on Puli which Pandi manages by hitting his cousin. But, Raghavi took it light when she got know that it was Puli's mischief & forgives him as she kind towards her juniors. Puli sometimes get tormented or beated by Bala Gang, still after Pandi he is the one make Raghavi smile whenver is upset. In the meantime the 11th standard students who were aware about Krish tried to brainwash & make him join their gang, but Krish simply refuses by asking them not to mess up with his friends. Once again the drug peddlers planned to attack Krish, Bala Gang who got the information tried to warn, but their efforts gobe avail. Yet Bala Gang rescues Krish along with the police who arrested the drug peddlers. Krish is got emotionally moved with Bala Gang & they accept him as their friend. Vineeth Gang is disturbed to see Krish with Bala Gang. Raghavi has been appointed as the mentor to the 11 standard students to which Rocky Gang doesn't care at all since they don't trust because she is their senior student, but Sullan Gang & Girls Gang doesn't agree with them since they are grateful to Raghavi who'd she'd withdrawn the election as per their request if not they would've definitely won the election, respects her responsibility to take additional classes for them, amidst her studies and moreover she is very kind and polite. Mano develops a crush for Vineeth & tries to show it in a different manner according to the idea of her friends, as usual his friends curiously asks what's between them to which Vineeth either smiles or answers them in an irritating manner. One day Rishi & Unni tried to rag Rocky Gang as they were showing off too much to which Rocky reacts arrogantly, Vineeth got infuriated & reacted in an aggressive manner to Rocky warning him to be in his limit & never mess up with his friends. This sparked a rivalry between Vineeth Gang & the 11th standard students. Vineeth Gang introduces themselves & talks to Mittu & Karthi asks them to feel free to talk rather gossiping about them. Jeeva often motivates the students, gives tips for improvement & helps them solve some of their problems as much he can. The 11th standard boys has gone through some changes as per Jeeva's tips such as style, hairstyle and attitude in order to be attractive & likeable like their senior students. 

Chidambaram discusses with Madhavi & staffs to conduct in inter-school Cricket tournament between the 12th standard students & 11th standard students. The aim for his decision is to keep his students competitive at the same united because he is aware about the ego clash between the 12th standard students & 11th standard students. Chidambaram assembles all his staff and students and announces the tournament as White Roses (12th standard students) vs Red Roses (11th standard students), whereas Gabriel & Jeeva will be leaders of the respective teams. Vineeth Gang isn't still in form to concentrate on the tournament. Bala Gang starts preparing in lighter way which gets serious when getting caught by Gabriel for their improper way of practice along with PT Peelisivam & Bala lying about the preparation of the list of team members. Jeeva positively leads his team without issues. Bala Gang recruits Krish into their team & starts practice to much of Vineeth's aversion & anger, Rishi & Unni unwillingly follows him. Bala is really worried because his team low number of players including himself & clueless on how to assemble the team. Gabriel warned Bala that their team will team be disqualified if they fail to submit the list as they are nearing the deadline. Raghavi who wishes to unite Bala Gang & Vineeth Gang uses this opportunity to convince them for the team's sake. Even though they don't have any choice, still they are reluctant for the compromise because of their ego, hatred & past bitter fights. Even Raghavi's arrangement of meeting between both the gangs get cancelled since none of them were present. Krish tried to talk with Vineeth that he'll leave their team, but Vineeth hits him, Rish & Unni intervened & stopped the fight. Bala informs his decision to his friends that they either  play tournament with Krish in the team, if not then withdraw Vineeth Gang isn't pleased to have Krish in the team, ultimately deciding to withdraw. Chidambaram, Jeeva, Gabriel & the students gather at the assembly to announce the teams. Jeeva welcomes his team, Rocky the captain of the team reads the list of team members. Gabriel welcomes his team. A confused Bala instead of withdrawing starts reading the income list of his team members hopelessly, but to their surprise Vineeth Gang joins them along assembling additional players to the team & confirms their presence to Gabriel. 

Even though Raghavi, Bala, Pandi & Jo are happy about it, Pachai is worried whether Vineeth will separate Raghavi from him which he tries to convey his friends as his fear that Vineeth might separate Raghavi from them which his friends doesn't take it serious. Bharathi a new English teacher joins the school, like Jeeva she is also an old student of this school. She has a love-hate relationship with Jeeva. Gabriel assembles the team announces Bala as the captain & Vineeth as the vice captain to the happiness of Bala Gang & slight disappointment of Vineeth Gang. Bala Gang & Vineeth Gang awkwardly starts their team meeting with Raghavi as the mediator on a funny note where Raghavi is happy that her friends have united at least for the team's sake. There was conflict between Sullan Gang & Rocky Gang when the latter insulted the former for inviting the have dinner at roadside, but next day Rocky apologizes to Sri explaining the reason for his behaviour which is Aadhi's health issues like lack of night vision & diabetes, so he behaved as such in order to conceal it from others to which Sri apologizes to Rocky & consoles him. Pachai's isn't well, going through medication after the insistence of Raghavi & talks good about Raghavi to which Pachai smiles which reminded her thelove poems he'd written in his notebooks doubting whether Pachai loves Raghavi, felt delicate because they are indebted for Raghavi & family's help & suppose if Pachai is in deed love with Raghavi it'll be like betraying their trust, so anyway she asks Pachai promise that he won't lose his focus on studies due disteactions like love to which Pachai unwillingly promises. Raghavi suddenly brought a gift hinting that it'll be presented to her best friend & her friends were very curious to know receive the gift & each of each them try to get it, even Pachai didn't receive the gift. But, Raghavi presents the gift to Bala declaring him s her best friend to which Pandi & Jo applause, but Pachai was completely upset over it. Raghavi visited Pachai's mother at home on her way to hospital with her husband, then inquires Pachai about his mood out & explains the reason why she'd presented to the gift to Bala since he behaved in a very matured manner not giving up Krish in their team along with accepting Vineeth Gang in their team, so as an appreciation she'd gifted him, but apart from she even says Pachai is best friend which is known to the entire even if she didn't present him a gift. Vineeth drops Mano at the school since her scooty got stopped to much of Rocky's anger which he shows it on Mano, but Mano was angry at the same confused over Rocky's behaviour along with her friends. Rocky has developed a crush for Mano, so he was upset as he was possessive on her, he gives love letter to Mano to much of her disappointment as she didn't expect this from Rocky. Instead of  making this issue big, the Girls Gang decided to approach Jeeva for smooth solution. Jeeva reads the letter & appreciated Rocky for his poetic lines, but Jeeva advises that this age isn't suitable for love because of lack of maturity, unstable mindset & distraction to studies, moreover since Mano isn't interested, so better give it up & consoles Rocky. Pachai is already disturbed because Bala once gave a hint about his crush that her name starts with "R", now with Raghavi presented him the gift had further disturbed making him worry what if Bala separates her from him. Bala Gang irritates Pachai for fun regarding the gift matter without knowing his mindset which turned out to be serious when Pachai unexpectedly got into a fight with Bala which was witnessed by Raghavi & became shocked. Bala is upset over Pachai's behaviour & his friends tries console him. Rishi & Unni mocks the fight between Bala & Pachai, but Vineeth sympathized them as he felt bad them since there is rift their friendship. Next day Pachai tried to talk to which Pandi, Jo & Raghavi scolds him for the way reacted towards Bala for a silly reason & says they'll talk to him if he patches up with Bala by apologizing to him. Pachai still remains adamant defending his side, stays all alone. Later Pachai was bullied by the 11th standard students, but when he solely tries confronting them for which Vineeth Gang comes for Pachai's support shut them down. Later Vineeth & Vineeth patches up after Vineeth releases Pachai from police station when he got caught along with area friend under suspicion. After seeing Pachai with Vineeth Bala Gang is shocked, especially Bala is disheartened. While Vineeth advises Pachai to consider patching up with Bala since friendship is something valuable. Bala faces an minor accident when his bicycle brakes failed. Pandi calls Pachai lying about Bala's accident, a panicked & worried Pachai rushes to his school & bursts into tears out of relief after seeing Bala being conscious with minor scatches & wounds & hits Pandi who tried to explain he situation & leaves crying. Then Pandi & Jo explained about their plan to show how much Pachai still has affection for Bala to which Raghavi scolds them & Bala silently leaves. Then Bala & Pachai apologizes to each other & had an emotional patch up happily witnessed by Raghavi, Pandi & Jo who cherishes the moment. Next day the entire Bala Gang rejoices the reunion of Bala & Pachai where Pandi brings a Keyboard requesting Krish to play it, Vineeth Gang hears Krish's playing of Keyboard reminds their memories with him & Vineeth leaves. Later Rishi & Unni talks about Krish's talent & asks why not consider accepting Krish like how he advised Pachai to patch up with Bala to which Vineeth leaves silently. Later Vineeth meets Pachai conveys his happiness over his reunion with Bala to which Pachai thanks for his timely advise, at the same time Pachai also asks Vineeth to consider patching up with Krish to which Vineeth remains silent. Bala Gang celebrates the compromise of Bala & Pachai.

Rishi & Unni asks to Vineeth if there is any love relationship to which he answers implying that it's Raghavi. The Girls Gangs have a conversation with Raghavi having some fun moments where the Girls Gang hinted that Pachai has interest on her to which Raghavi tensed and refused. The Girls Gang questions about his behaviour off late, they understood that Raghavi won't accept their opinion & they leave saying that soon she'll realize what they said was true. Raghavi is disturbed about the Girls Gang's opinion, yet confused. Mano got a transfer to another school where she was given a pleasant farewell through a send off party arranged by her friends where she gets emotional. Rocky was worried whether Mano is still upset with him that she didn't say about leaving the school, but she meets him, clarified that she'd forgotten it & accepts the gift of Rocky. 12th standard students gather for team meeting where their fun conversation becomes very serious When Rocky tells that he, Tom & Aadhi will be fore front players at the tournament as they have experiences in playing cricket tournaments before & rest of them will be taking backseat, this irked the Sullan Gang as they are being underestimated & both gangs enter into an argument which ended up into a fight, as a result they split into in 2 groups. Jeeva has returned to the school is upset about fight within his team members, asks them sort it and then to talk to him, moreover the possibility for the Cricket tournament is uncertain because of the clash within the 12th standard students. Even the Girls Gang condemn for their foolishness, they aren't even closer to their senior students. Jeevan is a leader of a group of school students close to this school which is a rival to this school, they often gets into a fight with either Bala Gang or Vineeth Gang gets beaten up. Already they along with their PT Master tried to mess up with the 11th standard students got nosecut. They try to mess up Bala Gang who come at practice at the ground where both the gangs gets into fight, Bala Gang beated & chased Jeevan group. As revenge Jeeva group sends henchman to beat up Bala, Pandi & Pachai later joined after Bala was attacked gives a police complaint. Vineeth Gang got know about yesterday's attack on Bala, Rishi & Unni guesses that it could've Jeeva Gang behind this attack, Vineeth got extremely angry with Jeevan Gang & finds them along with his friends where as retaliation they got into a fght with Jeevan Gan, beating them up. As a result of Vineeth Gang got suspended, Raghavi & Bala Gang who heard about it got surprised, following this incident both the gangs had united, especially Bala & Vineeth had an emotional union ending their years old rivalry to much of Raghavi's happiness. Rocky Gang hesitantly tries compromise with Sullan Gang & meets Sri & Madan who misunderstood Rocky, Tom & Aadhi had come to fight them, Rocky Gang got angry & frustrated with them & leaves scolding for misunderstanding their actual intention to which they Sri & Madan wonders whether were haste.

When Pachai joins Vineeth, Rishi & Unni about what's the special reason for their happiness to which  Vineeth says about his interest for Raghavi along with the promise he made Sanghavi, Pachai is upset though he doesn't show it explicitly. Once again who behaves aggressively to in order fight with Vineeth, but gives up for the sake their friends happiness over the union of both the gangs. Raghavi is worried about what the Girls Gang told her, she decides to clear doubt through Unni without revealing her actual problem and asks the behaviour of a person who is extremely in love to which the answers given by Unni upsets Raghavi as she'd seen such behaviour from Pachai. Gradually Pachai's marks are getting lower in all the subjects including Chemistry to much of his friends worry. Raghavi talks to Bala & Pandi regarding Pachai's problem, hinting whether he is in love with anyone. They meet one of Pachai's area friend who knows about Pachai's love, often gives advises to procced his love & inquires him about Pachai's love matter to which he says that is Raghavi is the girl with whom Pachai is love with which shocked Raghavi, Bala & Pandi. Raghavi is disappointed & couldn't bear that her best friend Pachai is like this, but Bala & Pandi decides to remain silent showing that they'd discovered his matter till he confesses it. Following day Pachai approaches his friends & senses something awkward about Raghavi, Bala & Pandi though they didn't show it. After some days a confused Pachai confronts his area friend who apologizes to him as he'd told his friends about his love matter & who the girl is which shocked Pachai & understood why they acting so strange. Bala & Pandi started their drama to which Pachai got angry & says that he'd found out what happened through his area friend & leaves crying. Then Raghavi, Bala & Pandi confronts Pachai to which he says that he truly loves Raghavi which angered her & she hits him. Pachai became angry & upset over Raghavi, Bala & Pandi by distancing himself from them. At this point Jeeva suggests for a trip to his hometown Sinthamani to which the 12th standard students & 11th students agrees travels with Jeeva, PT Peelisivam & Bharathi. There the students have fun, emotional moments especially Rocky who is reminded of his late mother when Jeeva's mother affectionately gives them food. Yet, Pachai is avoiding Bala, Pandi & Raghavi, instead hanging with Rishi & Unni. On the other hand Sullan Gang tries to compromise with Rocky Gang, but unintentionally ends up in a fight, but the students were appreciated by the villagers for their unity in a rope pulling game where all the students assembled together, despite all their differences. Jeeva had some funny moments with PT Peelisivam & some heart warming moments with Bharathi where she reminisce their friendship & remembering her hometown. Before leaving everyone seeks blessings from Jeeva's mother before saying good bye when says Pachai not be hard on Raghavi as she is a good girl. Jeeva, PT Peelisivam, Bharathi & the students leaves to Chennai. 

Despite Sullan Gang's efforts to reunite with Rocky Gang, all those efforts goes to no avail as they get into fights. After a point Sri and Rocky became worst rivals that they easily get into fights, but Vineeth & Bala who are now friends intervene and stop their fight in a cheerful manner. Pachai's performance in exams gets even worse that he gets lower marks than Pandi, a worried Gabriel meets Murugan asks whether Pachai which he doesn't know, so Gabriel tells that Pachai had failed all the exams at this rate he not only  will fail in 12th Public Exam, he won't be able to enter the exam itself. Murugan confronts Pachai about his marks to which he lies & Murugan hits him till his friends intervenes and stops him as he is worried about Pachai's performance as he & his wife has been paying the school fees with great difficulty with hope that he'll achieve big in life, especially his wife who prefers his studies over treatment. Pachai helplessly cries, later Murugan patches up with Pachai apologizing for hitting & asks about his problem to which Pachai cries & Murugan also cries while consoling him concentrate on studies to the pass the exams, then do whatever he wish. Raghavi is worried & clueless on how to bring Pachai back to track, then Bala & Pandi proposes an idea to Raghavi to pretend as she accepts his love. Raghavi is shocked by their idea to fake her emotions, yet unwillingly accepts for the sake of Pachai's future. Bala & Pachai lies about Raghavi's consent for his love to which Raghavi remains silent with smile. Pachai becomes happy believing their lie & becomes normal by talking to his friends & writing the exams well as result he got back his usual high marks for all subjects becoming the 1st rankholder in his class, but Raghavi loses some marks because of her inner pain of acting in front of Pachai losing her usual 
1st rank. At a point Pachai learns that it was a set up & Raghavi love him at all when he accidentally overhead the conversation of Bala & Pandi regarding how long to carry out this drama. A hearbroken Pachai decides to commit suicide leaving a letter at his home. Pachai's mother who has been discharged from hospital gets some terrible inner feeling, then senses a bad omen fearing about Pachai, reads the letter left by Pachai & gets fainted.

Kana Kaanum Kaalangal Season 2

Cast

School season
Season 1
 Hemalatha as Raghavi
 S. Sheva (Rishikesh) as Bala (Thala)
 Mohamed Irfan (Irfan) as Vineeth
 Yuthan Balaji as Joseph "Joe"
 Lingeswaran (Black Pandi) as Pandi (Black Pandi)
 Hariharan "Hari" as Krishnamoorthy "Krish"
 Vasudeva Krish Madhusudhan "Madhu" as Pachaiyappan "Pachai"
 Stalin  Shanmugavel as Rishi
 Iyappan as Unni Menon "Unni"
 Monisha Ravishankar as Sanghavi
 Kothai as Deepa
 Sheron as Ragini
 Preethi (Pavithra) as Saraswathi "Sis"
 Sri Ram (Sri) as Sri Ram "Sri"
 Kiran Konda as Madan
 Dinesh Prabhakaran "Dinesh" as Rakesh "Rocky"
 Sarath as Lingeswaran "Lingu"
 Ravikumar as Aadhi
 Ramesh Appunu as Thomas "Tom"
 Krishna Priya "Priya Atlee" as Priya
 Bhanu Chander as Rajendran, Sanghavi's father and Raghavi's adopted father
 Rekha as Lakshmi, Sanghavi's mother and Raghavi's adopted mother
 Raghavendran Ravi as Pulikesi (Puli Gates/Sullan)
 Sriram Chandrasekar (Gadam Kishan) as Ramakrishnan "Kichcha"/(Kishan) 
 Poornima as Karthika "Karthi"
 Haritha as Mintu
 Vaishnavi as Mano
 Chander as a school student
 Sabarna as a school student
 Ilavarasan as Raghavi's biological father
 Meera Krishnan as Raghavi's biological mother
 Naren (Aadukalam Naren) as Chidambaram, correspondent
 Anbazhagan "Anbu" as PT Peeli Sivam, PT master
 Jeeva as Jeeva, biology teacher
 Kalpana Sri as Madhavi, principal
 Raviraj as Gabriel Arokyaraj, Joseph's father & chemistry teacher
 Senthi Kumari as teacher
 S. R. Kaviya Varshini Arun as Bharathi, English teacher
 Saakshi Siva as Vineeth's father 
 Peeli Sivam as Moorthy 
 Brindha Das as Vineeth's mother
 Ramana Ramakrishnan as Bala's father 
 Nesan as Deepa's uncle
 Jhayasundari as Deepa' mother
 Sachin as Bala's brother
 Kuyili as Jeeva's mother 
 Shailaja as Krishnamoorthy's mother
 Engineer Srinivasan as Rajendran's father
 Kousalya Senthamarai as Rajammal, Rajendran's mother
 S. Ramakrishnan as Bala's father
 Rathnaraj as Kathiresan, police Inspector
 Chelladurai as Pandi's father
 Shobana as Pandi's mother
 Theni Murugan as Murugan, Pachaiyappan's father
 Sumathi Sri as Pachaiyappan's mother
 Pasi Sathya as Pandi's aunt
 Minnal Deepa as PT Peeli Sivam's wife 
 Suchithra as Kalavathi, Raghavi's sister
 Ganesh Babu as teacher
 Jayakanthan as Shanmuganathan, teacher
 Karnaa Radha as teacher
 Vincent as Vincent, teacher
 Birla Bose as police inspector
 Vinoth as Ilam Parithi
 Rangadhurai (Rajaguru) as Jeevan group's PT master
 Master Udayaraj as mechanic 
 Sivakarthikeyan as himself (special appearance)
 Cheran as himself (special appearance) 
 Deepak Dinkar as himself (special appearance) 
 Venkat as Himself (special appearance) 
 Divyadharshini "DD" as herself (special appearance) 
 Nisha Venkat as herself (special appearance)
 Sruthi as herself (special appearance)
 Nancy Jennifer as herself (special appearance)
 Swaminathan as Gaja/Aalaiyamani (Temple bell) (special appearance)
 Gowthami Vembunathan as herself (special appearance)
 Athul Prasanth (special appearance)
 Savio (special appearance)

Season 2
 Sri Ram "Sri" as Sri Ram "Sri"
 Vignesh Kumar "Vicky Krish" as Vignesh "Vicky"
 Kiran Konda as Madan
 Dinesh Prabhakaran "Dinesh" as Rakesh "Rocky"
 Ravikumar as Aadhi
 Ramesh Appunu as Thomas "Tom"
 Krishna Priya "Priya Atlee" as Priya
 Hema as Hema
 Michael Thangadurai as Michael Varadharaj
 Raghavendran Ravi as Pulikesi "Puli"(Puli Gates/Sullan)
 Jhony as Jhony
 Prabhu as Prabhu
 Udhay as Udhay
 Sriram Chandrasekar (Gadam Kishan) as Ramakrishnan "Kichcha"/(Kishan)
 Monica
 Hemalatha as Raghavi
 Ligeswaran (Black Pandi) as Pandi (Black Pandi)
 Vasudeva Krish Madhusudhan "Madhu" as Pachaiyappan "Pachai"
 Stalin Shanmugavel as Rishi
 Iyappan as Unni Menon "Unni" 
 Bhavya Rajan as Bhavya
 Venkat Renganathan as a student
 Azhagappan as a student
 Bala Saravanan as a student
 Anandhi Ajay as a student
 Sri Vidya Nagarajan as a student
 Anbazhagan "Anbu" as PT Peeli Sivam
 R. Raveendran "R. Ravi"/(Jeeva Ravi) as Sri Ram, Vignesh and Bhavya's father
 Y. V. Subaramaniam as Correspondent
 Deepa Nethran as Vicky and Bhavya's mother and Sri Ram's step mother
 Usha Elizabeth as Sri Ram's mother and Vignesh and Bhavya's step mother
 Kamal Haasan (Kamal Bharathi) as Kamal Haasan, English teacher
 Raviraj as Gabriel Arokyaraj, principal
 Rathnaraj as police inspector
 Chelladurai as Pandi's father
 Theni Murugan as Murugan, Pachaiyappan's father
 Pattukkottai Sivanarayana Moorthy as Pulikesi's grandfather
 Varalakshmi as Pulikesi's grandmother
 Suryakanth as Pechiyammal's father and Pandi's uncle
 Vinoth (Larawin) as Larawin, dance master
 Vincent as Vincent, teacher
 Birla Bose as a police inspector
 Sivakarthikeyan as himself (special appearance) 
 Shreekumar "Shree" as himself (special appearance) 
 Dev Anand as himself (special appearance) 
 Tinku as himself (special appearance) 
 Divyadharshini "DD" as herself (special appearance)  
 Swaminathan as Gaja/Aalaiyamani (Temple bell) (special appearance)
 Roopesh as himself (special appearance)

College season
Season 1
 Karthik Raj as Karthikeyan "Karthi"
 Prem Kumar "Prem" (Vetri) as Vetri 
 Sai Pramodita as Jeyalaxmi "Jeya"
 Swetha Krishnan as Swetha
 Swetha Subramanian as Jyothika "Jyo" 
 Bala Saravanan as Bala 
 Ramesh Thilak as Azhagesan alias Al Gates
 Chathrien Rajan as Chathri "Kathadi"
 Franklin as Appu
 Vishnu Vijay (Vishnu) as Ashokan "Ashok"
 Haripriya as Haripriya 
 Ganesh Prabhu as Saravanan "Saravnana"
 Nisha Krishnan as Divya
 Jacqueline Prakash as Nila
 Rajani Ravikumar as Rajini
 Harini as Harini
 Laddu Vidya as Vidya (Laddu) 
 Sandhya as Sandhya
 Monalisa as Monalisa
 Mithra as Mithra
 Kushboo as Thamizharasi
 Sakthi as Sakthi
 Lingeswaran (Black Pandi) as Thangappandi
 Dinesh as Rakesh "Rocky"
 Raghavendran as Jakkubhai "Jakku"
 Sriram Chandrasekar (Gadam Kishan)
 Karthick Vasudevan "Vasu" as Vasu
 Madhan Pandian "Madhan" as Madhan
 Bala Krishnan "Bala" as Inba
 Sindhu Shyam as correspondent
 Suzane George as a lecturer
 S. Rajasekar as Rajasekar
 Raviraj as a lecturer
 R. Raveendran "R. Ravi" (Jeeva Ravi) as Manohar, secretary
 Thirumurugan Duraisamy as Thiru (Sullan)
 Halwa Vasu
 Suryakanth as MLA, Thangapandi's father
 Vadivel Balaji
 Robo Shankar
 T. Sivakumar (Pasanga Sivakumar) as Saravanan's father
 Usha Elizabeth as Elizabeth
 Dhanasekaran (Mullai) 
 Monkey Ravi
 Ananth Vaidyanathan as himself (special appearance)
 Divya Vijaygopal as herself (special appearance)
 Sathish Krishnan as himself (special appearance in the title song)

Season 2
 Prem Kumar "Prem" (Vetri) as Vetri
 Kavirajan (Kavin Raj/Kavin) as Siva
 Rio Raj as Palani
 Raju Jeyamohan as Jeevanantham "Jeeva"
 Asritha Sreedas as Sandhya
 Vaishali Radhakrishnan (Swetha) as Vaishali
 Sai Gayatri Bhuvanesh as Manjula
 Rishika Suman as Stella
 Abinaya as Thenu
 Sanchana Natarajan as Sanjana
 RJ Shivakanth as Kathir
 Britto Mano as Britto
 Pavel Mani as Mani
 Sridhar as Raghunath, college correspondent/Shiva and Vetri's father
 Deepa Nethran as Lakshmi, lecturer/Shiva's mother and Vetri's stepmother
 Lakshmi as Vetri's mother and Shiva's stepmother
 Pooja as Pooja, lecturer
 T. V. V. Ramanujam as Kathir's father
 Shobana as Kathir's mother
 Boys Rajan as Menon principal
 Halwa Vasu as Vasu
 Suryakanth as Palani's father
 Shiva Aravind as Shiva

Soundtrack
The title song was composed by the music director Vijay Antony and the background score was composed by C. .K. Ganesh with lyrics written by Thenmozhi Das. The title song video was directed by Shiran Mather.

Awards and nominations

Production

Casting
Star Vijay conducted a talent search  and students between 14 and 22 years were shortlisted and selected for the serial except  Hemalatha and Ligeswaran, who had prior acting experience. All others were students who were acting for the first time to make the serial as close to reality as possible. Following the success of season 1 of the series, season 2 was started with fresh new faces and were promoted to 12th standard. When the producer and director announced the interview for the selection of the cast for second season, it was said that nearly 2000 applicants applied and they had a very tough time in short listing the participants in the selection.

Filming
This series was filmed in Chennai, Kodaikanal, Coimbatore, Trichy, Madurai, Thanjavur, Nagapattinam, Rameswaram & Sinthamani.

Reception
Kana Kaanum Kaalangal went on to top the TRP ratings among the other Tamil serials during its telecast. In 2007, the series had recorded its highest rating of 7.7 TVR in Chennai which helped to increase Star Vijay's average channel share by 16.4 per cent in Chennai and the series was in the leading position among the other Tamil serials which were telecasted during the same time slot, achieving an average channel share by 16.2 per cent in Tamil Nadu. 
	
In June 2007, the series had completed its 100th episode. In order to celebrate the milestone that the series had achieved, a live chat was organized on indya.com through which the fans got an opportunity to interact with the team members of the series. On 10 June 2007, Star Vijay had also organized a fan meet for the series "Kana Kaanum Kaalangal Carnival" at St. George's School, Chennai. The carnival had witnessed more than thousands of fans who had gathered to meet the lead actors and actresses of the series.

Legacy
Kana Kaanum Kaalangal was a trendsetter series in Tamil television in many ways since almost all the artists of the series were fresh faces for whom the series was their 1st acting assignment or they had earlier appeared as child artists/uncredited extras in serials or movies. The artists for the lead characters were selected by a talent hunt conducted by Star Vijay with a judge panel consisting of Praveen Gandhi, Vasu Vikram and Prabhu Radhakrishnan, moreover, an acting workshop was also conducted by Kalairani for the artists who were selected to play the lead characters. This series marked the debut of many artists as well as technicians for whom the series became a major breakthrough following its grand success. Most of the artists from the series continued to work in lead/supporting roles in serials/cinema and became successful in various other domains of media and arts as well. 
 	
After 15 years of the series commencement, the grand reunion of the artists from the series from various seasons was aired as a special show on 18 July 2021 on Star Vijay.

References

External links
 

Star Vijay original programming
Tamil-language school television series
Tamil-language teen television series
Tamil-language romance television series
2000s Tamil-language television series
2006 Tamil-language television series debuts
Tamil-language television shows
2008 Tamil-language television series endings
Indian teen drama television series